John James "Fats" Dantonio (December 31, 1918 – May 28, 1993) was a Major League Baseball catcher for the Brooklyn Dodgers in 1944 and 1945.

Dantonio is one of many ballplayers who only appeared in the major leagues during World War II.  He made his major league debut on September 18, 1944, in a road game against the Boston Braves at Braves Field.

He played in just 3 games in '44, then batted .250 in 47 games the next season.  His career totals for 50 games include a .244 batting average (33-for-135), 12 runs batted in, 12 runs scored, a .301 on-base percentage, and a .304 slugging percentage.  As a receiver he was well below average, making 14 errors in 182 total chances for a low fielding percentage of .923.

Dantonio died in his hometown of New Orleans, Louisiana, at the age of 74.

External links

Encyclopedia of Baseball Catchers
Retrosheet

1918 births
1993 deaths
Baseball players from New Orleans
Brooklyn Dodgers players
Caruthersville Pilots players
Columbus Red Birds players
Major League Baseball catchers
Minor league baseball managers
New Iberia Cardinals players
New Orleans Pelicans (baseball) players
St. Paul Saints (AA) players
Springfield Cardinals players
Taft Cardinals players
Jesuit High School (New Orleans) alumni